24 Oras Bikol, formerly Baretang Bikol is a Philippine television news broadcasting show broadcast by GMA Bicol. Anchored by Elmer Caseles, 
it premiered on September 17, 2012 replacing Bicolandia Isyu Ngonian. It was simulcasted in TV-7 Naga, TV-12 Legazpi, TV-8 Daet, TV-2 Sorsogon, TV-7 Masbate and TV-13 Catanduanes.

History

2010-2012: Pre-launch
Prior to the launch of the newscast, GMA Bicol aired Flash Bulletin, a daily news bulletin program aired several times from Monday to Friday from September 10, 2010 in order to provide local news, significantly during the Peñafrancia Festival. It was followed by the launch of another daily program, Isyu Ngonian on November 22 of the same year.

2012-2014: As Baretang Bikol
The newscast was launched on September 17, 2012, several weeks after the launch of GMA Bicol as an originating station, and expanded its coverage to the entire Bicol region. Its main anchor, Elmer Caseles, used to anchor the two preceding programs of the regional station.

2014-2015: As 24 Oras Bikol
Following changes in now-main newscast 24 Oras, Baretang Bikol was rebranded as 24 Oras Bikol since November 10, 2014. However, the newscast was suddenly got cancelled after more than two years of broadcast (opposite GMA Ilocos' 24 Oras Ilokano, formerly Balitang Ilokano, which aired in June 2012) due to the strategic streamlining happened to all provincial stations of the network. Following the cancellation was the retrenchment of its staff and personalities and the closure of the network's regional news department.

GMA Bicol would not have a regional newscast until 5 years later, with the launch of Balitang Bicolandia on February 1, 2021.

Area of Coverage
Naga City and Camarines Sur
Legazpi City and Albay
Daet and Camarines Norte
Virac and Catanduanes
Masbate City and Masbate 
Sorsogon City and Sorsogon

Final Anchor
Elmer Caseles (Now with 89.5 Radyo Natin Naga)

Final Field Reporters
Avril Daja
Mark Bongat
Kaye Botastas
Chariza Pagtalunan (Carried over to Balitang Bicolandia as its Program Manager)
Michelle Chua
Maila Aycocho 
Michael Biando

Former Field Reporters
Michael Jaucian

References

External links

GMA Network news shows
GMA Integrated News and Public Affairs shows
Philippine television news shows
2012 Philippine television series debuts
2015 Philippine television series endings
Mass media in Naga, Camarines Sur